Zuzaku is a populated place in the Kamenicë municipality, Kosovo.

Notes

References

Villages in Kamenica, Kosovo